The FTE automotive Group is a German automotive manufacturing company specialized in the sector of drive train and brake system applications for the automotive industry. The company supplies all notable automobile manufacturers and employs over 3800 employees at 11 production sites around the world. FTE automotive is based in Ebern, Bavaria, Germany. On June 2, 2016, Bain Capital sold FTE Automotive to the French automotive supplier Valeo for 819.3 million euros.

Production sites 
 FTE automotive GmbH, Ebern, 
 FTE automotive Möve GmbH, Mühlhausen, 
 FTE automotive systems GmbH, Fischbach (Ebern), 
 FTE automotive (Taicang) Co., Ltd. 
 FTE automotive Czechia s.r.o., Podborany, 
 FTE automotive Slovakia s.r.o, Prešov, 
 FTE automotive USA Inc., Auburn Hills, 
 FTE Industria e Comercio Ltda, São Paulo, 
 FTE Mexicana S.A. de C.V, Puebla, 

Joint Venture:
 APG-FTE automotive Co. Ltd., Hangzhou, 
 SFMC s.r.o., Prešov,

Products 
The company produces a multitude of hydraulic brake and clutch components:

 Brake boosters
 Dual centric slave cylinders 
 Electric lube oil pumps 
 Gear actuator modules 
 Parking lock cylinders
 Cooling oil valves
 Brake caliper replacements
 Brakes hoses
 Electro-hydraulic actuators 
 Clutch master cylinders
 Clutch slave cylinders
 Clutch pipes
 Drum brakes
 Concentric slave cylinders

The product portfolio included electrical sensors  and accessories.

References

Auto parts suppliers of Germany